Skin Graft Records (officially capitalized SKiN GRAFT Records) is an independent record label specializing in no wave and noise rock, originally based in Chicago, Illinois. The label is largely responsible for spawning "now wave" genre, an updated version of the late 1970s/early 1980s no wave movement.

History
In 1986, SKiN GRAFT was begun by Mark Fischer and Rob Syers as a small-scale publisher of bizarre comic books and fanzines. Some of its comics included The Kidz and Cynicalmanson.

The label's first record was released at the end of 1991. Founder Mark Fischer said of the label in 2000, "Skin Graft is a comic book company that puts out records. "  The label's mascot is Hot Satan, a simply drawn cartoon devil, usually shown issuing the "heavy metal horns" hand sign.

Bands who have recorded for the label include Dazzling Killmen, Koenjihyakkei, Brise-Glace (featuring Jim O'Rourke,), Cheer-Accident, The Strangulated Beatoffs, Zeek Sheck, The Chinese Stars, The Flying Luttenbachers, Lake Of Dracula, Gorge Trio, Colossamite, Shorty, U.S. Maple, ZZZZZ, Made In Mexico, Melt-Banana, Quintron, Flossie And The Unicorns, Yona-Kit, You Fantastic!, Ruins, Space Streakings, Zeni Geva, AIDS Wolf, Mount Shasta, Arab On Radar, Yowie, Athletic Automaton, and PRE.

In keeping with the label's origins, many SKiN GRAFT musical releases (particularly 7" records and LPs) have included mini comic books as inserts.  The label has also used non-traditional packaging with some of their releases. The early vinyl copies of U.S. Maple's first album were packaged in metal sheets, and Colossamite's 1998 untitled EP came packaged with 5-inch frisbees of varying colors.

From 1994 to 1998, and in 2002, SKiN GRAFT curated the OOPS(!) Fests, featuring many of its bands, along with sideshows and various styles of impromptu performance art.

In the late 1990s, the label purported (as a thinly veiled hoax) that a European record label named SiN RAFT was illegally issuing bootleg copies of SKiN GRAFT releases.

Roster 

 AIDS Wolf
 Arab On Radar
 Athletic Automaton
 AIDS Wolf versus Athletic Automaton
 Big'n 
 Brise-Glace
 Cellular Chaos
 Cheer-Accident
 Child Abuse
 The Chinese Stars
 Chrome Jackson
 Colossamite
 Dazzling Killmen
 The Denison/Kimball Trio
 Doomsday Student
 Flossie and the Unicorns
 The Flying Luttenbachers
 Fruitcake
 Gay Beast
 Gorge Trio
 Holy Smokes
 Koenjihyakkei
 Korekyojinn
 Lake Of Dracula
 Lovely Little Girls
 Made In Mexico
 Mama Tick
 Melt-Banana
 Mount Shasta
 My Name Is Rar-Rar
 PRE
 Point Line Plane
 Quintron
 Q Electronics
 Ruins
 Ruins Alone
 Sax Ruins
 Satanized
 Shakuhachi Surprise
 Shorty
 Skryptor
 Space Streakings
 Strangulated Beatoffs
 UFO Or Die
 U.S. Maple
 Yona-Kit
 You Fantastic!
 Xaddax
 Yowie
 Zeek Sheck
 Zeni Geva

References

External links
 Official website

Record labels established in 1991
American independent record labels
Alternative rock record labels
Noise music record labels
1991 establishments in Illinois